Mahesh Anand (13 August 1961 – 9 February 2019) was an Indian actor, dancer and martial artist who worked in Hindi, Tamil, Telugu and Malayalam films. He is remembered for playing villainous roles in Hindi films. He was a black belt in Karate and was a model and a trained dancer before he started acting. His debut movie was Karishmaa 1984 while his last on-screen appearance was in the 2019 comedy-drama Rangeela Raja. Before acting in Karishmaa he performed for the opening sequence of Sanam Teri Kasam 1982 with his dance in silhouette.

Filmography

Telugu

Tamil

Malayalam

Death 
On 9 February 2019, his maid failed to get any response from him after ringing the bell of his residence many times. She then immediately informed his sister who came there with Versova Police. Anand was found dead, sitting on a sofa and a bottle of alcohol & a food plate was found lying on a table beside him.

References

External links
 

1961 births
2019 deaths
20th-century Indian male actors